Get Your Man is a 1921 American silent drama film directed by George Hill and William K. Howard and starring Buck Jones, Beatrice Burnham and Helene Rosson.

Cast
 Buck Jones as Jock MacTier
 W.E. Lawrence as Arthur Whitman 
 Beatrice Burnham as Lenore De Marney
 Helene Rosson as 	Margaret MacPherson
 Paul Kamp as 	Joe

References

Bibliography
 Connelly, Robert B. The Silents: Silent Feature Films, 1910-36, Volume 40, Issue 2. December Press, 1998.
 Munden, Kenneth White. The American Film Institute Catalog of Motion Pictures Produced in the United States, Part 1. University of California Press, 1997.
 Solomon, Aubrey. The Fox Film Corporation, 1915-1935: A History and Filmography. McFarland, 2011.

External links
 

1921 films
1921 drama films
1920s English-language films
American silent feature films
Silent American drama films
American black-and-white films
Fox Film films
Films directed by George Hill
Films directed by William K. Howard
1920s American films